Malta originally planned to participate in the Eurovision Song Contest 2020 with the song "All of My Love" written by Bernarda Brunović, Borislav Milanov, Sebastian Arman, Dag Lundberg, Joacim Persson and Cesár Sampson. The song was performed by Destiny Chukunyere, who had previously represented Malta at the Junior Eurovision Song Contest in the 2015 edition where she achieved first place with the song "Not My Soul". The Maltese entry for the 2020 contest in Rotterdam, the Netherlands, was selected through the second season of the music competition X Factor Malta, organised by the Maltese broadcaster Public Broadcasting Services (PBS). The competition concluded with a final on 8 February 2020 where Destiny Chukunyere eventually emerged as the winner. The song Destiny would perform at the Eurovision Song Contest, "All of My Love", was internally selected and was released to the public on 9 March.

Malta was drawn to compete in the first semi-final of the Eurovision Song Contest which was to take place on 12 May 2020. However, the contest was cancelled due to the COVID-19 pandemic.

Background 
Prior to the 2020 Contest, Malta had participated in the Eurovision Song Contest thirty-two times since its first entry in 1971. Malta briefly competed in the Eurovision Song Contest in the 1970s before withdrawing for sixteen years. The country had, to this point, competed in every contest since returning in 1991. Malta's best placing in the contest thus far was second, which it achieved on two occasions: in 2002 with the song "7th Wonder" performed by Ira Losco and in the 2005 contest with the song "Angel" performed by Chiara. In the 2019 edition, Malta qualified to the final and placed 14th with the song "Chameleon" performed by Michela Pace.

For the 2020 Contest, the Maltese national broadcaster, Public Broadcasting Services (PBS), broadcast the event within Malta and organised the selection process for the nation's entry. PBS confirmed their intentions to participate at it on 25 September 2019. In 2019, PBS utilised the newly created talent show format X Factor Malta, a method that was continued for their 2020 participation, which resulted in the selection of a winning performer that would subsequently be given an internally selected song to perform at Eurovision.

Before Eurovision

X Factor Malta 
The Maltese artist for the Eurovision Song Contest 2020 was selected through the second season of X Factor Malta, the Maltese version of the British television reality music competition The X Factor created by Simon Cowell. The second season premiered on 6 October 2019 and concluded with a final on 8 February 2020. In addition to selecting the Maltese Eurovision entrant, the winner also secured a record contract with Sony Music Italy. All shows in the competition were hosted by actor Ben Camille and broadcast on Television Malta (TVM) as well on the broadcaster's website tvm.com.mt.

Selection process 
Acts of 15 years of age and over were able to submit their applications starting from 20 January 2019 by Whatsapp messaging a video audition. The chosen auditionees as determined by the show's producers to progress through the selection process were invited to the last set of auditions that took place in front of the judges between 24 and 27 June 2019 at the Esplora Interactive Science Centre in Kalkara. The four judges were:

 Ira Losco – Singer-songwriter, represented Malta at the Eurovision Song Contest in the 2002 and 2016 editions
 Howard Keith Debono – Music producer
 Ray Mercieca – Singer-songwriter and musician, lead singer of the band The Rifffs
 Alexandra Alden – Singer-songwriter

120 contestants were selected by the judges to progress to the bootcamp round, which they were split into the four category groups - Boys, Girls, Overs and Groups, and were given one song to sing a cappella. 30 acts were eliminated and the remaining 90 acts each selected a song from the Wall of Songs, which they had to perform with three others who had selected the same song. In the final challenge, the remaining acts, including newly formed groups, performed a song of their own choice and the judges selected a total of 37 acts to go through to the Six Chair Challenge filmed at the Malta Fairs & Conventions Centre in Attard on 20 and 21 September 2019. 24 acts advanced to the Judges' Houses, broadcast on 22 and 29 December 2019, during which the four judges eliminated 3 acts from each category with a total of 12 acts advancing to the live shows.

Live shows
Key:
 – Winner
 – Runner-up
 – Third Place

Song selection 
On 9 March 2020, PBS announced that Destiny would perform the song "All of My Love" at the Eurovision Song Contest 2020. "All of My Love" was written by members of the songwriting team Symphonix International, Bernarda Brunović, Borislav Milanov, Sebastian Arman, Dag Lundberg, Joacim Persson and Cesár Sampson. The release of the song and official music video was made available online on the broadcaster's website tvm.com.mt and the official Eurovision Song Contest website eurovision.tv.

At Eurovision 
According to Eurovision rules, all nations with the exceptions of the host country and the "Big Five" (France, Germany, Italy, Spain and the United Kingdom) are required to qualify from one of two semi-finals in order to compete for the final; the top ten countries from each semi-final progress to the final. The European Broadcasting Union (EBU) split up the competing countries into six different pots based on voting patterns from previous contests, with countries with favourable voting histories put into the same pot. On 28 January 2020, a special allocation draw was held which placed each country into one of the two semi-finals, as well as which half of the show they would perform in. Malta was placed into the first semi-final, to be held on 12 May 2020, and was scheduled to perform in the second half of the show. However, due to 2019-20 pandemic of Coronavirus, the contest was cancelled.

References

2020
Countries in the Eurovision Song Contest 2020
Eurovision